The Rio Grande Wild and Scenic River is a U.S. National Wild and Scenic River that protects  of the Rio Grande in New Mexico and Texas. The designation was first applied in 1968 to a  stretch of the river in New Mexico; an additional  of the river in Texas was added in 1978, followed by another  in New Mexico in 1994.

The lower  of the Red River, a tributary of the Rio Grande in Taos County, New Mexico, was also added to the Wild and Scenic River System. The two rivers intersect in the Wild Rivers Recreation Area.

Approximately  of the Wild and Scenic River in Texas is within Big Bend National Park; the remainder is downstream of Big Bend. Three rugged canyons are preserved under this designation: Boquillas Canyon is the most accessible, as it can be reached via a popular RV campground; Mariscal Canyon can only be entered via a high-clearance four-wheel-drive vehicle; and entrance to the Lower Canyon, due to rapid size, is only possible by signing a National Park Service liability or "acknowledgement of risk" waiver. The Wild and Scenic River designation does not include Santa Elena Canyon, which is the most popular recreational area in Big Bend.

Gallery

See also
List of National Wild and Scenic Rivers

References

External links

Rio Grande Wild and Scenic River - National Park Service
Rio Grande Wild and Scenic River - Bureau of Land Management

Protected areas of Brewster County, Texas
Rio Grande
Protected areas of Terrell County, Texas
Protected areas of Val Verde County, Texas
National Park Service areas in Texas
National Park Service Wild and Scenic Rivers